Badminton competitions at the 2021 Junior Pan American Games in Yumbo, Colombia were scheduled to be held from November 26 to 29, 2021.

Canada went on to sweep all three gold medals.

Medal summary

Medal table

Medalists

References

Badminton
Pan American Games
Badminton in Colombia
Qualification tournaments for the 2023 Pan American Games